The Department of Education was an Australian government department that existed between December 1984 and July 1987. It was the second so-named Australian Government department.

Scope
Information about the department's functions and/or government funding allocation could be found in the Administrative Arrangements Orders, the annual Portfolio Budget Statements and in the department's annual reports.

According to the National Archives of Australia, at its creation, the department was responsible for education, other than migrant adult education.

Structure
The department was an Australian Public Service department, staffed by officials who were responsible to the Minister for Education, Susan Ryan.

The department was headed by a secretary, initially Dick Johnson (1984‑1985) and subsequently Helen Williams (1985‑1987). When Williams earned her secretary appointment, she was the first ever woman to be elevated to a position at the head of an Australian Government department.

References

Education
Ministries established in 1984
Ministries disestablished in 1987